Gambler is a 1995 Indian Hindi-language action film directed by Dayal Nihalani, which is a remake of the Malayalam film Aanaval Mothiram.

Plot
Police Inspector Dayashanker Pandey is a slacker, a man who does not want to put his life under any risk, and is quite comfortable sharing tall tales, and a desk job. Fate has other plans for him, for whenever he goes on duty outside, he somehow apprehends some criminals or some smuggled goods or drugs. He thus becomes the pride of his division, much to his discomfort. For Dayashanker knows that if he is publicly felicitated, this will put him in the black books of many underworld gangsters, which will rip his comfortable and easy-going life apart.

Cast 
 Govinda as Inspector Dayashankar Pandey
 Aditya Pancholi as Inspector Shiva 
 Shilpa Shetty as Ritu / Radha
 Gulshan Grover as Contract Killer Billa "Meaow-Meaow" 
 Ali Asgar as Dayashankar's Young Brother 
 Mohan Joshi as Karianna
 Johnny Lever as Havaldar Babulal
 Tinnu Anand as Tinu / Chhota (Jaichand's brother)
 Rohini Hattangadi as Mrs. Pandey, Dayashankar's Mother
 Raj Babbar as Jaichand
 Shiva Rindani as Babu Kania
 Saeed Jaffrey as Police Commissioner Avtar Kaushik 
 Sudhir Dalvi as Mr. Pandey, Dayashankar's Father
 Daya Shankar Pandey as rapist caught by Inspector Shiva at the beginning of the Movie (uncredited role)
 Ghanshyam as Havaldar
 Manmauji as Havaldar
 Gurbachchan Singh as Inspector Saxena

Music
The music of this movie was composed bu Anu Malik. This movie has some popular songs like "Hum Unse Mohabbat Karke", "Meri Marzi" and "Stop That".

External links
 
Gambler.com The Gambler.com

References

1990s Hindi-language films
Films scored by Anu Malik
Hindi remakes of Malayalam films
Indian action drama films